The Muro Dam was a Roman dam in Portugal. Located near the eastern municipality of Campo Maior, it is the largest surviving ancient dam in the country south of the Tagus river.

The 174 m long structure features three slight bends in its course. Its downstream side is supported by a series of thirteen small buttresses at intervals of 3–4 m. The central section, where the dam is highest and strongest, is further strengthened on its air-side by three vertical arches which go from buttress to buttress.

See also 
List of Roman dams and reservoirs
Roman architecture
Roman engineering

References

Sources

External links 
Ministério da Cultura: Barragem Romana do Muro 
Barrages romains du Portugal: Barrage de Muro (no. 16)  

Dams in Portugal
Ancient Roman dams